William Zies (June 16, 1867 – April 16, 1907) was a professional baseball catcher. He played two games in Major League Baseball in 1891 for the St. Louis Browns of the American Association. He had one hit in three at bats.

External links

Major League Baseball catchers
St. Louis Browns (AA) players
Monmouth (minor league baseball) players
Ottumwa Coal Palaces players
Rock Island-Moline Twins players
Rock Island-Moline Islanders players
Jacksonville Jacks players
Springfield, Illinois (minor league baseball) players
Sherman Students players
Paris Midlands players
Denison Tigers players
Baseball players from Illinois
19th-century baseball players
Sportspeople from Rock Island, Illinois
1867 births
1907 deaths